The Pacific Northwest languages are the indigenous languages of the Pacific Northwest of North America.  This is a geographic term and does not imply any common heritage for these languages.  In fact, the Pacific Northwest is an area of exceptional linguistic diversity and contains languages belonging to a large number of (apparently) unrelated families.  However, the close proximity of multiple languages has created many opportunities for mutual interaction, with the result that the Pacific Northwest forms a linguistic area, with many areal features that are shared across language families. These include animacy hierarchies and case markers that cliticize to the end of the word before the noun phrase being marked for case.

The linguistic area is centered on the Salishan, Wakashan and Chimakuan families.  Some features are also shared with Tsimshianic, Chinookan and Sahaptian languages, as well as Kutenai, a language isolate.

These languages are well known for their complex phonetic systems, particularly their large number of dorsal obstruents.  Tlingit, for example, has about 24 different stop consonants and fricatives in the velar, uvular, and glottal areas (as well as five different lateral obstruents).  Also common are a number of other consonants that are unfamiliar to English speakers, such as pharyngeal consonants and ejectives.

References 

 

Northwest Coast Sprachbund (North America)